Chiloglanis brevibarbis, the short barbelled suckermouth, is a species of upside-down catfish native to Kenya and Tanzania where it is found in the Athi and Tana River systems.  This species grows to a length of  TL.

References

External links 

brevibarbis
Freshwater fish of Kenya
Freshwater fish of Tanzania
Taxa named by George Albert Boulenger
Fish described in 1902